Imode may refer to:
 i-mode, a mobile internet service used in Japan
 Imode, Nigeria, a village in Nigeria

See also 
 IMOD (disambiguation)
 Emode (disambiguation)